This article contains a comprehensive collection of information related to recordings by Scottish-American composer, musician, and producer David Byrne, former singer for Talking Heads.

Talking Heads

Byrne appeared on every release by Talking Heads, including their studio albums:

And the live albums:

Solo career
While recording with Talking Heads, Byrne started working on collaborations and albums without the band.

Studio albums

 "—" denotes albums that were released but did not chart, albums not released in a particular territory, or chart information is not available.

Soundtracks and music for theater

 "—" denotes albums that were released but did not chart, albums not released in a particular territory, or chart information is not available.

In addition to the scores and soundtracks that have been released as albums, Byrne has written music for several other productions:
Dead End Kids: A Story of Nuclear Power by Joanne Akalaitis
Main title theme for Alive from Off Center season 1 (1984)
Something Wild by Jonathan Demme: "Loco de Amor" song co-written with Johnny Pacheco; sung with Celia Cruz backed by Ray Barretto's band (1986)
Married to the Mob by Jonathan Demme (1988)
A Young Man's Dream and a Woman's Secret by Philip Haas (1990)
The Giant Woman and the Lightning Man by Philip Haas (1990)

Live albums

 "—" denotes albums that were released but did not chart, albums not released in a particular territory, or chart information is not available.

Remix albums

 "—" denotes albums that were released but did not chart, albums not released in a particular territory, or chart information is not available.

Singles
"Regiment" b/w "America Is Waiting" (with Brian Eno) – 1981
"The Jezebel Spirit" (with Brian Eno) – 1981
"Big Blue Plymouth (Eyes Wide Open)" – 1981
"The Last Emperor" (with Ryuichi Sakamoto)  – 1987
"Make Believe Mambo" – 1989
"Dirty Old Town" – 1989
"The Forestry" – 1991
"Hanging Upside Down" – 1992
"She's Mad" – 1992
"Girls on My Mind" – 1992
"Angels" – 1994
"Back in the Box" – 1994
"Miss America" – 1997
"Like Humans Do" – 2001
"U.B. Jesus" – 2001
"Strange Overtones" (with Brian Eno) – 2008
"Who" (with St. Vincent) – 2012
"Everybody's Coming to My House" – 2018

Collaborations

Compilation appearances

Production
Talking Heads produced or co-produced all their own music; in addition, Byrne has produced:

Other projects
Byrne has released a handful of books, including Arboretum, a collection of sketches of some of his favorite trees, and The New Sins, a work about sin in the 21st century. He has also made several public art installations, speaking engagements on art and technology, and PowerPoint presentations. In addition to a recording career as a solo artist, he also founded the record labels Luaka Bop and Todo Mundo.

References

Discography from DavidByrne.com
Discography from Discogs
 further reading: Sytze Steenstra: Song and Circumstance. The Work of David Byrne from Talking Heads to the Present. New York and London: Continuum, 2010.

Discography
Alternative rock discographies
Discographies of American artists
Production discographies
Discographies of British artists